Westwood Community School District is a school district headquartered in Dearborn Heights, Michigan, United States, in Metro Detroit. It serves portions of Dearborn Heights, Inkster and Dearborn; the sections of Dearborn within the district are zoned for industrial and commercial uses.

In summer 2013, the Inkster Public Schools District was entirely dissolved and Westwood school district absorbed some of its boundary. Students north of Michigan Avenue and east of Middlebelt were rezoned to Westwood.

Schools

Secondary schools
 Robichaud High School (Dearborn Heights)
 Tomlinson Middle School (Inkster, formerly Tomlinson Elementary School)

Primary schools
 Daly Elementary School (Inkster)
 Thorne Elementary School (Dearborn Heights)

Former schools
McNair Elementary School (Inkster) - this school has been razed.
MoKersky Elementary School (Inkster) - formerly the Bethlehem Temple of Inkster Christian Academy, this school is now for sale
Roosevelt Elementary School (Dearborn Heights) - this school has been razed
Westwood Elementary School (Inkster) - this school has been razed

References

External links

 Westwood Community School District
 District map. Michigan Department of Information Technology Center for Geographic Information. See 2008 map (prior to absorption of the portion of Inkster Public Schools).

Education in Wayne County, Michigan
School districts in Michigan
Dearborn Heights, Michigan
Inkster, Michigan